Manuel Sosa may refer to:

 Manuel Sosa (actor) (born 1983), Venezuelan actor
 Manuel Sosa (judge) (born 1950), Belizean judge
 Manuel Ruiz Sosa (1937–2009), Spanish football midfielder and manager